Roburnella wilsoni is a species of small sea snail or bubble snail, a marine gastropod mollusc in the family Oxynoidae.

Roburnella wilsoni is the only species in the genus Roburnella.

The specific name "wilsoni" is apparently in honor of U.K./Australian malacologist John Bracebridge Wilson (1828-1895), who collected the type specimen.

Distribution 
The type locality for this species is from  Port Phillip, Victoria, Australia.

Description 
Roburnella wilsoni was described based on collection of U.K./Australian malacologist John Bracebridge Wilson (1828-1895). It was originally described (under name Lobiger Wilsoni) by Australian biologist of British origin Ralph Tate in 1889.

The original text (the type description) reads as follows:

References

External links 
 http://www.seaslugforum.net/factsheet/robuwils

Oxynoidae
Gastropods described in 1889
Taxa named by Ralph Tate